The Timothy P. Bailey House is a historic house in Andover, Massachusetts.  It was built by Timothy Palmer Bailey, on land purchased from his father's estate.  The Baileys were successful farmers, and the younger one, who was educated at Phillips Academy, built this locally rare example of an Italianate house in 1878.  The -story L-shaped house features bracketed cornices, and a main entrance porch that is elaborately balustraded and also bracketed.

The house was listed on the National Register of Historic Places in 1982.

See also
National Register of Historic Places listings in Andover, Massachusetts
National Register of Historic Places listings in Essex County, Massachusetts

References

Houses in Andover, Massachusetts
National Register of Historic Places in Andover, Massachusetts
Houses on the National Register of Historic Places in Essex County, Massachusetts
1878 establishments in Massachusetts